Disney Channel is a children's television channel owned and operated by The Walt Disney Company Limited.

History
On 28 February 2003, almost 80 years since the founding of The Walt Disney Company and almost 20 years since the launch of the original Disney Channel in the United States, the Disney Channel was launched, and was then at the time exclusive to the Viasat satellite platform (Sirius 4).

Later that year, it became available on digital cable networks, such as the Swedish Com Hem. Once the channel was originally launched, the only programs aired were animated, many of which were not Disney Channel Original Series (as they are called in the U.S.). The first live-action series aired on Disney Channel was Smart Guy, which debuted in 2005.

In 2003, the channel also applied for a license to broadcast in the Swedish digital terrestrial television network. The Disney Channel was among the channels recommended by the Swedish Radio and TV Authority, and the government granted the Disney Channel a broadcasting license on 29 January 2004. The terrestrial transmissions could start on 15 February via the Boxer TV Access platform. Soon after that, the channel celebrated its first anniversary by dropping encryption for one weekend. On 1 August 2005, the channel became available to subscribers of the Canal Digital (Thor 2) satellite platform. Simultaneously, a sister channel called Toon Disney was launched. A third sister channel, Playhouse Disney, was launched on 1 October 2006.

In the fall of 2009, the channel started broadcasting its first original productions. Among these are a sitcom called Når klokkerne ringer, produced by the Danish production company Nobody, and the music competition My Camp Rock, produced by Titan Television.

In January 2012, Disney Channel Scandinavia got the same on-air logo and graphics as the UK version of Disney Channel at the time. Later in May 2012, the channel updated to 16:9 (widescreen).

Since 1 August 2012, the channel has been airing advertisements between the shows. In the fall of 2012, the Disney Channels in Sweden, Norway and Denmark split feeds during the commercial breaks so it would be easier to air local advertisements; however, the promos and schedule are the same in the Nordic countries.

In 12 October 2012, a Russian audio track was added.

In October 2013, Disney Channel Scandinavia introduced its own locally produced mini-series, Violetta: The Scoop, in which they catch up with Violetta, show sneak peeks, and talk about "secrets" from the show.

On 29 May 2014, Disney Channel Scandinavia began using new on-air graphics and a new logo, both created by BDA Creative. The new logo was first introduced on the German Disney Channel in January 2014 when it went free-to-air and later on 23 May in the U.S.

On 28 February 2023, Disney Channel ceased broadcasting on Allente, along with the Russian-language audio track. However, it remains in other providers. The same day, the feed ceased broadcasting in the Baltics and was replaced by the EMEA feed of Disney Channel, except Home3, satellite service.

Programming

The channel is mainly aimed at children, broadcasting Disney television series 24 hours daily. Disney feature films are also an important part of the channel's programming. All of the programs are dubbed into local languages. Since autumn 2012, Disney Channel broadcast with different video streams between the countries with its audio stream, but schedule is still the same.  Many syndicated programs have been aired on Disney Channel, such as The Fairly OddParents and Scaredy Squirrel.

Other channels and services

Disney Junior

Disney Junior is a channel aimed at preschoolers which was launched in October 2006 on the Canal Digital and Viasat satellite operators as Playhouse Disney. Later on, the channel was launched on cable operators. On Com Hem, the largest cable operator in Sweden, the channel was launched on 2 April 2007. On 10 September 2011, Playhouse Disney was rebranded as Disney Junior.

Disney XD (closed)

Disney XD was a male-skewed children's channel which broadcasts 16 hours a day between 6:00 AM CET and 10:00 PM CET. It replaced Jetix and Toon Disney on 12 September 2009. Jetix used to end its daily broadcasts at 6:00 PM. Disney XD is funded by advertising, as was Jetix, while Toon Disney was commercial-free. It closed down on 31 December 2020.

External links 

 Official Swedish Schedule
 Official Norwegian Schedule
 Official Danish Schedule
 Disney Channel Sverige on YouTube
 Disney Channel Norge on YouTube
 Disney Channel Danmark on YouTube

Logos

References

Scandinavia
Commercial-free television networks
Television channels and stations established in 2003
Pan-Nordic television channels
Children's television networks
Television stations in Denmark
Television channels in Norway
Television channels in Sweden
Television channel articles with incorrect naming style
Television channels in Finland
Television channels in Iceland
2003 establishments in Sweden
2003 establishments in Denmark
2003 establishments in Finland
2003 establishments in Norway